Robert Bruce Olderman (June 6, 1962 – October 20, 1993) was an American football player who played one season with the Kansas City Chiefs of the National Football League (NFL). He was drafted by the Chiefs in the fourth round of the 1985 NFL Draft. He played college football at the University of Virginia and attended Marist School in Brookhaven, Georgia.

References

External links
Just Sports Stats

1962 births
1993 deaths
Players of American football from Pennsylvania
American football offensive guards
Virginia Cavaliers football players
Kansas City Chiefs players
People from Brookville, Pennsylvania
Marist School (Georgia) alumni